Elachista bassii is a moth of the family Elachistidae that is found in the north of Nepal.

One third of the forewing, beneath the costa, is occupied by a yellowish white fascia from which bronzy area starts. The ventral side of the wings is brilliant grey. The females are brachypterous.

Etymology
The species is named for Dr. Graziano Bassi.

References

bassii
Moths described in 2006
Endemic fauna of Nepal
Moths of Asia